Fatal Beauty (soundtrack album) is the official soundtrack album for the 1987 movie Fatal Beauty. Executive producers were David Chackler and Sylvia Rhone; music coordinators were Marty Wekser for Sounds of Film, Ltd. and Merlin Bobb for Atlantic Recording Corporation.

Track listing
"Donna Allen - Make It My Night" (4:12)(Danny Sembello/Tony Haynes) No Pain, No Gain/Unicity Music/Ertloejay Musique/WB Music Corp., ASCAPProduced by Jeff Smith and Peter Lord
"LeVert - Casanova" (5:01)(Reggie Calloway) Calloco Music/Hip Trip Music, BMIProduced by Reggie Calloway and Vincent Calloway for Calloco, Inc.
"Madame X - Just That Type of Girl" (6:22)(Bernadette Cooper/Cornelius Mims) Slap Me One! Music/Cornelio Carlos Music/Spectrum VII Music, ASCAPProduced by Bernadette Cooper for Slap Me One! Productions and Cornelius Mims
"Miki Howard - Edge of Love" (4:35)(Cynthia Weil/Scott Cutler) Dyad Music/Tyrell-Mann Music, BMIProduced by Steve Tyrell and David Kitay for the Tyrell Music Group
"Shannon - Criminal (Theme from Fatal Beauty)" (3:38)(Sylvester Levay/Tom Whitlock) GMPC/Levay Music, ASCAPProduced by Mike Piccirilo
"The System - Didn't I Blow Your Mind" (4:20)(Mic Murphy/David Frank) Science Lab Music, ASCAPProduced by The System for Science Lab Productions
"Debbie Gibson - Red Hot" (3:55)(Deborah Gibson) Creative Bloc Music Ltd./Deborah Ann's Music, ASCAPProduced by John Morales and Sergio Munzibai for Another M+M Production, Inc.
"War - Sin City" (3:24)(Harold Faltermeyer/Scott Wilk/Linda Never) Kileauea Musikverlag GmbH/Yellow Brick Road Music/Valevista Music, ASCAPProduced by Harold Faltermeyer

References

Fatal Beauty (soundtrack album)
Fatal Beauty (soundtrack album)
Atlantic Records soundtracks